Xueyuan Road Subdistrict is a subdistrict on the east side of Haidian District, Beijing, China. It shares border with Qinghe Subdistrict to its north, Aoyuncun and Yayuncun Subdistricts to its east, Huayuan Road Subdistrict to its south, Zhongguancun Subdistrict and Dongsheng Town to its west. It had 226,315 residents as of 2020. 

The subdistrict‘s name Xueyuanlu came from a road that runs through the subdistrict, which in turn was named so for the concentration of universities around the area, including University of Science and Technology Beijing, China Agricultural University and Beijing Language and Culture University, among others.

History

Administrative Divisions 
As of 2021, Xueyuan Road Subdistrict was made up of 30 communities:

See also 

 List of township-level divisions of Beijing

References 

Haidian District
Subdistricts of Beijing